István Nyers (25 May 1924 – 9 March 2005), also known as Stefano Nyers, was a Hungarian footballer who played as a forward or as a winger. Although he played in only two international matches for Hungary, he is considered one of the greatest football legends of his country, reaching the peak of his career in the 1940s and 1950s.

Career 
Nyers was born in Freyming-Merlebach, Moselle, France into an immigrant Hungarian mining family; his younger brother was Ferenc Nyers.  When he was 14 he moved with his family to Budapest where he started playing with III. Kerületi TUE.  He will have his first official debut aged 17 and playing with Szabadkai VAC which was a Yugoslav club from Subotica that played in the Hungarian league system after the Hungarian annexation of Bačka during World War II (1941–1944). When Yugoslavs retook Subotica, Nyers moved to Budapest where he had a short spell with Ganz-MÁVAG SE where he played along László Kubala. Still that year, he returns Szabadkai VAC, known as ŽAK Subotica in Serbo-Croatian. In April 1945, ŽAK is disbanded by new Yugoslav authorities, but players stay together and they make a tour throughout Serbia as a representing team of Subotica. In this tour they archive many large-margin wins. By scoring in all important games, Nyers confirms himself as prolific goalscorer. Upon their return to Subotica, the new authorities merge the team with some minor clubs, and the team becomes Spartak Subotica. However, later that year, Nyers leaves Yugoslavia and returns to Budapest, where he joins 1945 Újpest FC, winning two league titles. In 1946, he transferred briefly to the Czechoslovakian team FK Viktoria Žižkov and then to the French club Stade Français.

After two years in Paris he was recruited by the Italian side Inter. Here he developed to one of the strongest forwards in the history of Serie A. With 26 goals in his first season he became the top scorer of the league. In 182 games for Inter he scored a total of 133 goals. Twice, in 1953 and 1954, he became Italian champion with Inter.

After winning the championship for the second time Nyers left Milan and changed via Servette FC of Geneva to A.S. Roma, where he remained for two years. A season with the Catalan sides CF Barcelona, Terrassa FC and CD Sabadell followed before he played out the remainder of his career with minor league Italian clubs.

Nyers retired from the professional game in 1961. During his retirement he lived for several years in Milan before settling in Subotica, Serbia until his death in 2005 at the age of 80.

Honours

Club
Újpest
 Nemzeti Bajnokság I: 1945, 1945–46

Internazionale
 Serie A: 1952–53, 1953–54

Barcelona
 Copa del Rey: 1957

Notes

External links 
 István Nyers at magyarfutball.hu
A biography page 

1924 births
2005 deaths
People from Freyming-Merlebach
French people of Hungarian descent
Hungarian footballers
Hungary international footballers
Hungarian expatriate footballers
Stade Français (association football) players
Ligue 1 players
Inter Milan players
Servette FC players
A.S. Roma players
Calcio Lecco 1912 players
Budapest Honvéd FC players
Újpest FC players
La Liga players
FC Barcelona players
CE Sabadell FC footballers
Terrassa FC footballers
FK Viktoria Žižkov players
ŽAK Subotica players
Nemzeti Bajnokság I players
Serie A players
Serie B players
Expatriate footballers in Yugoslavia
Expatriate footballers in Czechoslovakia
Footballers from Grand Est
Expatriate footballers in Italy
Expatriate footballers in Spain
Expatriate footballers in Switzerland
Association football forwards
Sportspeople from Moselle (department)
French expatriate footballers
Hungarian expatriate sportspeople in Italy
Hungarian expatriate sportspeople in Spain
Hungarian expatriate sportspeople in Yugoslavia
French expatriate sportspeople in Italy
French expatriate sportspeople in Spain
French expatriate sportspeople in Yugoslavia